

History 

The Universidad México Internacional (UMI) is a private university located in Culiacán, Sinaloa, Mexico. It is focused on business and communication degrees. Their mission is to train leaders for the future. The university has specifically worked with companies like," Grupo Michelín, Coca-Cola, Grupo Dispamocusa and Grupo de Banqueros del Noroeste," to create certification and training processes to best serve students.

Core Values 
The university values are leadership, wisdom, creativity, innovation, respect, affection for art, humility, social sensitivity, love for family, and entrepreneurial spirit.

View(s) 
"To be a leading national institution for the contribution of its research to the social, cultural and economic development of Mexico, the professional quality of its graduates and capable of attracting the best professors from our country and abroad."

Academics 
UMI offers bachelors degrees in:

 Arts
 Communication Sciences
 Global Commerce
 Business Management 
 Industrial Engineering and Administration
 Marketing and Advertising

Along with a master's in business management.

Specialized Certificate's in:

 Oral Communication
 Art and Integral Design 
 Oral Communication and Business Presentations
 3D Digital Design and Postproduction

And a specialized seminar in oral communication (Children).

References

External links
 Universidad Mexico Internacional website 

Private universities and colleges in Mexico